Agali may refer to several places:
Agali monastery, in Visigothic Spain
Agali, Palakkad, a village in Palakkad district, Kerala, India
Agali (gram panchayat), a Gram panchayat of Palakkad district, Kerala, India
Agali mandal, a mandal in Anantapur district, Andhra Pradesh, India
Agali, India, within the mandal
Agali, Estonia, village in Võnnu Parish, Tartu County, Estonia
Lake Agali, Extonia
Agali River, Estonia

See also
Ağalı (disambiguation), places in Azerbaijan